Wattle Ridge is a locality in the Toowoomba Region, Queensland, Australia.

Geography 
The Gore Highway passes through the location from north (Condamine Farms / Cypress Gsrdens midpoint) to west (Bulli Creek). Most of the land in the locality is undeveloped.

References 

Toowoomba Region
Localities in Queensland